The K13 gas fields were major natural gas producing fields in the Netherlands sector of the North Sea, about 130 km west of Den Helder. The fields started producing gas in 1975 but are no longer operational except for one installation used as a riser platform.

The fields 
The K13 gas fields are located in the Southern North Sea. The K13 A field was discovered in 1972, followed by the B field in 1973, the E field in 1976 and the F field in 1977. The gas reservoirs have the following properties:

Development 
The K13 reservoirs were developed by a number of offshore installations across the K13 Block. The K13-A complex was the hub of the field, it received gas from its bridge-linked riser platform and from K13 Block satellite platforms. The K13–C installation received gas from platform K10–B. 

The K13-C complex also received gas from K10-B.

The pipelines in the field were:

The main 36” gas pipeline had a capacity of 39 million cubic metres per day.

Production 
The process plant on K13–A comprises 2 trains each with one 3-phase separator. Gas flows through a suction scrubber to a 4,500 horse power compressor then via a filter separator to a gas/glycol contact tower. Condensate is pumped into the gas pipeline, water is discharged to the sea.

The process plant on K13–C comprises 2 trains each with one 3-phase separator. Gas flows through a suction scrubber to a 4,500 horse power compressor then via a filter separator to a gas/glycol contact tower. Condensate is pumped into the gas pipeline, water is discharged to the sea.

Peak production from the field was as follows (million standard cubic feet per day) in 1979:

In 1986 the K13 field produced 824.2 million cubic metres of gas.

Since 1992 gas production from the Markham gas field has been routed via K13.

Decommissioning 
In 1988 the five wells on production platform K13-D were plugged and abandoned. The same year, the topside of K13-D was moved to a new location in Netherland sector L8 becoming production platform L8-H.

The K13B jacket was lifted out of the field in 1997.

There is no longer any production from the original field or its satellite platforms. but K13–A is used as a bypass platform to treat and transport gas from the J6-A production platform (Centrica) and the K5-A production platform (Total) via the WestGas Transport gas pipeline to Den Helder. Since 2019, K13-A is a normally unmanned platform.

See also 

 Helder, Helm and Hoorn oil fields
 Kotter and Logger oil and gas fields
 L4-L7 gas fields
 L10 gas field
K7-K12 gas fields
K14-K18 gas fields

References 

North Sea energy
North Sea
Natural gas fields in the Netherlands